Suzy Shuster (born ) is an Emmy Award winning sportscaster, whose work has appeared on ABC Sports, ESPN, Turner Sports, FOX Sports and HBO.

Education
Shuster was educated at Columbia University and graduated with a degree in history and art history in 1994.  At Columbia, she had historian Kenneth T. Jackson as her academic advisor.

Career timeline
 Producer, ESPN's SportsCenter (1997–1998)
 Producer, Real Sports with Bryant Gumbel (1998–1999)
 Reporter/anchor, FSN West (2000–2002)
 Reporter, NBA TV (2004–2005)
 Sideline reporter, NBA on TNT playoffs coverage (2004–2005)
 Sideline reporter, College Football on ABC (2004–2005)
 host/reporter, Trojan Radio Network (2003–2009)
 Sports contributor, The Huffington Post (2011–2017)
 Fill-in host, The Rich Eisen Show (2014–present)

Personal life
Shuster is married to NFL Network anchor Rich Eisen. Shuster and Eisen have 3 children: Xander, Taylor, and Cooper.

References

American television producers
American women television producers
American television sports announcers
Living people
Year of birth missing (living people)
Columbia College (New York) alumni
College football announcers
Place of birth missing (living people)
21st-century American women